The 2013 Paris–Roubaix was the 111th edition of the Paris–Roubaix race that took place on 7 April and was the tenth race of the 2013 UCI World Tour. The race stretched  from start to finish and was won by Swiss rider Fabian Cancellara. Second and third were Belgian Sep Vanmarcke and Dutchman Niki Terpstra, respectively.

Teams
As the Paris–Roubaix was a UCI World Tour event, all 19 UCI ProTeams were invited automatically and obligated to send a squad and the organizers invited six wild card teams to participate.

The 19 UCI ProTeams were:

The wild cards invited were:

Race overview
's Niki Terpstra sealed the final place on the podium by winning the sprint amongst the chasing group.

Results

See also
 2013 in road cycling

References

External links

Paris–Roubaix
Paris-Roubaix
Paris-Roubaix
Paris-Roubaix